The Office of the Prime Minister and Council of Ministers  is a political and bureaucratic office that assists the Council of Ministers of Nepal and the Prime Minister of Nepal in the leadership of the Council of Ministers and Government. The incumbent Prime Minister is Pushpa Kamal Dahal and the current council of ministers is the Third Dahal cabinet.

Mandate 
The Office's mandate includes the formation, dissolution and alteration of organizational structure of the ministries, the formulation, approval or issue of Bills, Ordinances, and Rules, observation, control, inspection, supervision, coordination, monitoring and evaluation of various ministries and Order and the Protection and Promotion of Human Rights.

Organisational structure
The Office of the Prime Minister and Council of Ministers also oversees several departments, offices and commissions:
 Investment Board Nepal
 New Nepal Construction Fund
 Prime Minister's Disaster Relief Fund
 Commission for the Investigation of Abuse of Authority
 Public Service Commission
 National Human Right Commission
 National Planning Commission of Nepal
 National Vigilance Centre
 Public Procurement Monitoring Office
 Office of Nepal Trust
 Poverty Alleviation Fund
 Office of the President and Vice President
 Department of Revenue Investigation

References

Government ministries of Nepal